Qayah Bashi-ye Bozorg (also Romanized as Qayah Bāshī-ye Bozorg; also known as Qayah Bāshī) is a village in Mulan Rural District of the Central District of Kaleybar County, East Azerbaijan province, Iran. At the 2006 National Census, its population was 1,746 in 363 households. The following census in 2011 counted 1,628 people in 410 households. The latest census in 2016 showed a population of 1,456 people in 466 households; it was the largest village in its rural district.

References 

Kaleybar County

Populated places in East Azerbaijan Province

Populated places in Kaleybar County